Gian-Carlo Carra is a municipal politician who currently serves as Councillor of Ward 9 in Calgary, Alberta. He was first elected in 2010 and subsequently re-elected in 2013 and 2017.

Campaign platform
His campaign platform, "Great Neighbourhoods" under which he ran in the three elections is a "synthesis of leading practices from across North America, grounded in the ideal that "Great Neighbourhoods make a Great City."

Education
Carra completed both his BA and his MA (Environmental Design/Urban Design) at the University of Calgary.

Professional life
Before being elected to Council Cara worked from 2000 to 2010 in sustainable urban design.

Tenure as city councillor
The area he served—Ward 9—includes the communities of Acadia, Bridgeland/Riverside (part), Dover, Erlton, Fairview, Inglewood, Manchester, Ogden, Parkhill, Ramsay, Renfrew, Rideau Park, Riverbend, Roxboro, Tuxedo Park, Winston Heights/Mountview.

He served under Mayor Naheed Nenshi who was also first elected to office in October 2010.

Electoral record

2010 municipal election
Carra was elected to serve Ward 9 in the 2010 election, taking 31% of the votes with runner-up Steve Chapman taking 12% of the votes.

2013 municipal election
Carra was reelected in the 2013 election by capturing 48% of the votes with Jordan Katz taking 26%.

2017 municipal election
Carra was one of five Calgary politicians targeted by an anonymous newly formed political action committee (PAC) called Save Calgary who gave Carra a "failing grade".

2021 municipal election
Carra was reelected to a 4th term at the 2021 election, capturing 36% of the vote, slightly ahead of challenger Naomi Withers with 35%.

Volunteer work
Carra began working with the Inglewood Community Association in Inglewood in 2000 and by 2003 became the President of the Association where he served until 2010.

Personal life
Carra is married to Barb and they have a son, Vance Urbano, who was born in 2012.

References

External links 
 City of Calgary Ward 10 homepage

Living people
Calgary city councillors
Year of birth missing (living people)
21st-century Canadian politicians
University of Calgary alumni